Prairie Dog Creek is a stream in the central Great Plains of North America. A tributary of the Republican River, it flows for  through the American states of Kansas and Nebraska.

Geography
Prairie Dog Creek originates in the High Plains of northwest Kansas. From there, it flows generally northeast across northwestern Kansas. Southwest of Norton, Kansas, it is dammed to form Keith Sebelius Lake. From the reservoir's dam, the creek continues northeast to Harlan County in south-central Nebraska where it joins the Republican River to feed Harlan County Reservoir.

History
The Battle of Prairie Dog Creek (August 21, 1867) ended the Army's offensive operations against the Indians on the Kansas frontier for the year. 

In 1964, the U.S. Bureau of Reclamation completed a dam on the creek southwest of Norton, Kansas for flood control, irrigation, and municipal water supply, creating Keith Sebelius Lake.

See also
List of rivers of Kansas

References

Rivers of Kansas